2005 Division Series may refer to:

2005 American League Division Series
2005 National League Division Series